Inverpeffer was a hamlet that once existed in Angus, Scotland until around 1941, when it was demolished during the building of East Haven airfield.

It was on a return journey from Inverpeffer to Barry in 1797 that loomwright Thomas Lowson fell asleep in grassland belonging to Major William Phillips. Lowson, enamoured of the area, approached Phillips, securing a feu of land, and built the first house in the village that was to become Carnoustie.

Today, a single building from the former hamlet remains.

References

Villages in Angus, Scotland
Former populated places in Scotland